Sarcophaga carnaria is a European(globalized) species of flesh fly within the common flesh fly genus, Sarcophaga.

Identification
Only males can be identified with certainty, and then only by examining genitalia.

Biology
Larvae mostly feed on earthworms. Adults are attracted to rotting meat and faeces.

Distribution

European, from the U.K. and southern Europe, east to the Altai mountains and north to the Kola Peninsula.

References

Sarcophagidae
Insects described in 1758
Taxa named by Carl Linnaeus